Milton Delugg (December 2, 1918 – April 6, 2015) was an American musician, composer and arranger.

Early years
Milton Delugg was born in Los Angeles, California. He said, “There aren't any Deluggs. It's not a real name.” He believed the family's ancestral name to be D’Luggatch. Delugg's great grandfather said no one could pronounce it so he changed it to “Delugg,” with a lower case “L”. 

Delugg attended the University of California, Los Angeles. His initial musical training was on a piano. Moving to the accordion came as the result of a gift. "When my dad gave me an accordion I learned how to play jazz on it," he said. "I grew up in Los Angeles and it wasn't long before I had a monopoly on any calls for jazz accordionists."

Military service
Delugg served in the Radio Production Unit of the US Army Air Force during World War II. During that time he was a member of (and sometimes soloist with) the 36-piece orchestra of the West Coast Army Air Force Training Center.

Biography
A talented accordionist, Delugg appeared in short Soundies musicals and occasional movies (like 1949's Jolson Sings Again). He quickly became a successful arranger and composer and worked as bandleader at Slapsie Maxie's Wilshire location in Hollywood. His clients ranged from the American Junior Miss Pageant to soul singer and performer Jackie Wilson, and he was a musician on such radio programs as School Days of the Air, and The Abe Burrows Show. One of his best-known tunes is an arrangement of the song "The Happy Wanderer", and his brassy polka "Hoop Dee Doo" became a game show staple.

In 1950 and 1951, Delugg was musical director, bandleader, and accordionist on Broadway Open House the NBC late-night television program considered to be the forerunner to The Tonight Show. He often played a song he co-wrote,  "Orange Colored Sky", which was best remembered as a hit for Nat King Cole. In 1950, Delugg was also orchestra conductor for the short-lived Abe Burrows' Almanac.

In 1953, the Milton Delugg Trio appeared on the short-lived The Bill Cullen Show. Four years later, in 1957, Delugg joined the cast of the Winchell and Mahoney Show.

He composed the tune "Roller Coaster" – recorded by Henri Rene Orchestra on RCA Victor. It was used as the closing theme for the popular Goodson-Todman Productions panel show What's My Line? from the early 1950s until its cancellation in 1967.

Based in New York City, Milton Delugg was also active in the recording industry. In 1958 he produced the Buddy Holly single, "Rave On!".

Television projects
Delugg served as NBC's musical director for decades. In 1966, he was briefly musical director of The Tonight Show Band during the tenure of Johnny Carson.

Delugg enjoyed a long association with Chuck Barris, beginning as arranger of the original theme to The Newlywed Game in 1966. From 1976 to 1980, he was musical director of The Gong Show (appearing with his "Band With a Thug"). Delugg often appeared on the show as a comic foil, in the characters of bad joke teller Naso Literatus and philosopher Old Drool. Delugg's venerable "Hoop Dee Doo" became a fixture on The Gong Show, and was used whenever the contest winner was chosen.

Delugg also wrote the theme music for other Barris projects including The $1.98 Beauty Show, Camouflage (where, in a throwback to an earlier era of game shows, the music was actually performed live by Delugg and his band), Leave It to the Women, 3's a Crowd, and The New Treasure Hunt. He also recorded new versions of the theme songs to the 1970s versions of The Dating Game and The Newlywed Game, as well as providing the themes for their 1980s revivals. Delugg and sidemen Mark Stevens, Billy Neale, and Ray Neapolitan appeared in Barris's The Gong Show Movie (1980) as The Hollywood Cowboys.

Delugg remained active as musical director of the annual Macy's Thanksgiving Day Parade through 2013, and made one final, on-camera appearance during the 2014 parade.

Film soundtracks
Delugg and his wife Anne composed film scores and songs for the mid-1960s American releases of German and Japanese children's films such as  Gulliver's Travels Beyond the Moon, Der gestiefelte Kater (Puss in Boots), Sleeping Beauty, and Snow White and the Seven Dwarfs. 

Delugg composed the score for Santa Claus Conquers the Martians and the song "Hooray for Santa Claus".

Song credits
Delugg composed a number of popular songs that became hits for a variety of artists, including "Orange Colored Sky" (Nat "King" Cole, 1950); "Shanghai" (Doris Day, (1951); "Be My Life's Companion" (The Mills Brothers, 1951); "Shake Hands With Santa Claus" (Louis Prima, 1951); "The Photograph On The Piano" (Georgia Gibbs, 1952); "Just Another Polka" (Eddie Fisher, 1953); and "A Poor Man's Roses (Or a Rich Man's Gold)" (Patsy Cline, 1956).

Personal life
Delugg and his wife, Anne, were married from 1946 until she died in 2002. They had three children. Their daughter died in 8th grade.

Death
Delugg died of heart failure at his home in Los Angeles, California, on April 6, 2015, at the age of 96.

References

Bibliography
Terrace, Vincent. Radio Programs, 1924–1984 (Jefferson, NC: McFarland, 1999)

External links

An interview with Milton Delugg, May 2011, Part One
An interview with Milton Delugg, May 2011, Part Two
 
Spaceagegroup.com
Milton DeLugg Interview - NAMM Oral History Library (2004)

1918 births
2015 deaths
American jazz accordionists
American jazz bandleaders
American jazz composers
American male jazz composers
Musicians from Los Angeles
The Tonight Show Band members
Jazz musicians from California
American music arrangers
United States Army Air Forces personnel of World War II